Rav Paltoi Yishia ben Rav Abaye Gaon HaKohen (Hebrew: רב פלטוי ישעיה בר אביי גאון הכהן:  – 858 ) was the Gaon of Pumbedita from 841 up until his death in 858. His time as Gaon would be defined by an idealistic and innovative tenure, which heralded a new era of prominence for the Gaonate of Pumbedita.

Biography 
Born in about 820, his father Abaye ben Natronai, was the paternal grandson of the Exilarch Mar-Zutra III. Despite that, his family were seen as poor. He was the youngest-ever Gaon, being appointed at just 21 years old, During his time as Gaon, his Halakic authority and influence stretched beyond just Babylon, reaching communities in Spain and North Africa. At one point, a community in Spain sent a letter to Rav Paltoi, requesting that he "write the Talmud and its explanations for them" on the bases that no one in their community would be knowledgeable enough to do so. Rav Paltoi vigorously protested against this, stating that "They are not acting correctly, and it is forbidden to do this. They thereby cause a decline in the study of the Torah, causing it to be forgotten." This exemplifies the idealistic attitude that defined him and the future of the Pumbedita Academy.  His responsa, can be found in most collections of Geonic responsa, as well as being quoted in the works of the posekim. Although this represents a minority of those he wrote. Although young, Rav Paltoi could be incredibly strict at times, excommunicating communities for disobedience of Halakha.  Rav Paltoi died in 858, and was succeeded by Aha Kahana ben Mar Rav. Paltoi's son Zemah ben Paltoi was the Pumbedita Gaon from 872 - 890.

References 

Date of birth uncertain
858 deaths
800s births
9th-century Jews
Geonim
9th-century rabbis
Rabbis of Academy of Pumbedita